Fossil Mountain is a mountain located south of Skoki Mountain in Banff National Park, Canada.  The mountain was named in 1906 by M.P. Bridgland, of the first ascent party, after the numerous fossils that can be found on its slopes.

Fossil Mountain is the site of the first known skiing fatality in the Canadian Rockies. On April 7, 1933, Raymond Paley died in a slab avalanche when he attempted to ski down the mountain after skiing almost to the top.

In February 1988, cousins Dan and Wayne Hugo (29 and 27 respectively) were hiking and skiing on Fossil Mountain when an avalanche, which they may have triggered, occurred. They both died.

Routes 
The scrambling route ascends easy scree slopes from Deception Pass. Due to these easy slopes, the mountain is sometimes ascended in winter by skiers.

References

External links 
 Fossil Mountain Route Beta - Dow Williams

Two-thousanders of Alberta
Mountains of Banff National Park